Leigh Barczewski (born December 25, 1955) is an American former cyclist. He competed in the sprint event at the 1976 Summer Olympics.

References

External links
 

1955 births
Living people
American male cyclists
Olympic cyclists of the United States
Cyclists at the 1976 Summer Olympics
Sportspeople from Milwaukee
Cyclists from Wisconsin